Amniscus assimilis is a species of longhorn beetles of the subfamily Lamiinae, and the only species in the genus Amniscus. It was described by Gahan in 1895.

References

Acanthocinini
Beetles described in 1895